MXTabs.net was an American music tablature website created in 1999, offering free guitar, bass, and drum tablature created by users of the site, in addition to music reviews and instrument lessons. Although the site shut down in June 2006 in response to claims made by the Music Publishers Association (MPA) about the supposed illegality of music tabs, it has since been bought by MusicNotes and now offers free, legal tablature.

The site was in public-alpha stage for some time as not all features had been added and tabs were available only to countries where a licence was in place. The site came out of public alpha stage and was launched on 1 July 2008. The site is now defunct and the domain name redirects to Songsterr, which has no relation to MXTabs.

History 
Mxtabs started out as a hobby drum website in 1999 by a young musician attempting to learn drums. As the site grew in size and popularity, it added subsites for guitar and bass guitar. Users would submit tablature for a song, and that tab would be incorporated into the website. Mxtabs continued to grow, increasing its database to over 150,000 tabs by December 2005, when the Music Publishers Association threatened websites that provided lyrics or tabs with jail time in addition to fines and shutting the websites down.

However, the MPA took no legal action at that time, only warning that they would begin doing so in 2006. Mxtabs responded on December 26, 2005 by taking their entire website offline. Later, the website was changed to simply forward viewers to its affiliate forum, MusicianForums.

On February 24, 2006, the owners of Mxtabs put the website back online with a letter explaining their position. In short, they believe that the purpose of Mxtabs is to "aid musicians in learning their instruments." They say that Mxtabs has accounted for as much as $3000 a month in sheet music sales, and offers many tabs that do not have equivalent sheet music published, so Mxtabs and similar sites are the only place that musicians can find a way to play these songs. The letter concludes by pointing out that tabs have never been proven to be illegal, then requesting that sheet music companies contact Mxtabs in order to create a system of tab licensing.

On June 25, 2006, the administrators of Mxtabs took the tablature offline once more. The website remained up with only one page: their final departing words, a 4 paragraph statement. There was no access to any of the tabs from the site. In their statement they claimed that "...to this date, we have not received any threatening letters, but are closing on our own volition. Mxtabs was reopened in February with the hope of receiving some sort of response; with the lack of that response, it is sadly time to close.".  Since this, the original MXTabs network shifted focus to revolve around Ferwerda's review site, Sputnikmusic.

On August 7, the website was re-opened, however, the tabs are inaccessible.

On March 27, 2007, MXTabs announced an agreement with the Harry Fox Agency, allowing for legal tabs in exchange for sharing ad revenue from the website. Tabs will be provided free to the public. Members of MXTabs will submit and improve tabs.

Mxtabs was believed to be reopening in the summer of 2007, however they did not reach private alpha stage until late 2007. According to the blog on the MXTabs website, the main problems were getting the last few companies to sign contracts with them. Also, they had to update the data on each of the 10,000 plus tabs to reflect the new way MXTabs will be working and add all of the new features they wanted.

As of October 10, 2007, the blog lists definitions for rebirth, seemingly implying that MXTabs is almost ready to be reopened. This coincides with MXTabs sending out emails notifying people of alpha testing positions. These emails have been set to those who registered their email addresses for updates.

As of February 26, the site has now been opened for use showing off the new layout of the website, but the tab pages come out with text reading

"License Restricted
We're sorry. The song whose tab you are trying to view is not licensed in your country (CANADA)"

The site does appear to work in the United States but some songs are not licensed yet and if you come across a song with no license the website ask you to fill out information about the song and the band to help them gain licenses quicker.

On May 9, tabs were made accessible to countries outside the United States, including Canada, United Kingdom and Australia among others. However, the availability depends on the licensing agreements.

After several big announcements due May (Tab Summissions and many new publisher agreements, they announced the site will come out of public alpha stage and be launched on the 1 July 2008.

MXTabs officially launched on July 1, 2008, partnering with Taylor Guitars for a launch promotion contest.

On October 10, 2011, MXTabs.net shut down and redirected all traffic to partner Songsterr.com.

See also
Music Publishers Association
On-line Guitar Archive

References

External links
Mxtabs

Guitar websites
Internet properties established in 1999
American music websites
1999 establishments in the United States